Villa Guerrero Municipality may refer to:
 Villa Guerrero Municipality, Jalisco
 Villa Guerrero Municipality, State of Mexico

Municipality name disambiguation pages